Zelyonaya Roshcha is a rural locality (a selo) and the administrative center of Zelenoroshchinsky Selsoviet, Rebrikhinsky District, Altai Krai, Russia. The population was 536 as of 2013. There are 10 streets.

Geography 
Zelyonaya Roshcha is located 15 km east of Rebrikha (the district's administrative centre) by road. Klyuchevka is the nearest rural locality.

References 

Rural localities in Rebrikhinsky District